The 2022 Camping World SRX Series was the second season of the Superstar Racing Experience. The six-race season began at Five Flags Speedway on June 18 and ended at Sharon Speedway on July 23. Tony Stewart entered the season as the defending series champion, having won the inaugural season in 2021. Marco Andretti won the championship by two points over Ryan Newman despite having no wins on the season.

Drivers

Full-time drivers

Part-time drivers

Guest drivers

Schedule
The 2022 schedule was announced on January 31, 2022. It features a return to Stafford Motor Speedway and Nashville Fairgrounds Speedway after visiting those tracks in 2021, along with the addition of four new tracks to the series.

Broadcasting
All six races were broadcast live in the United States on CBS and Paramount+.

Allen Bestwick returned as the play-by-play announcer, Lindsay Czarniak returned as the host, and Matt Yocum returned as a pit reporter. After competing in the series as a driver in 2021, Willy T. Ribbs joined the SRX broadcast team in 2022 as the roving reporter, replacing Brad Daugherty. However, for the races at Stafford and I-55, Ribbs was instead a color commentator. As was the case in 2021, there was a rotating color commentator in the booth with Bestwick, with Ribbs at Stafford and I–55 and IndyCar Series driver Conor Daly at Five Flags, South Boston and the Nashville Fairgrounds. NASCAR Cup Series driver Joey Logano was the color commentator for the season-finale at Sharon Speedway.

Season summary

Race reports
All events consist of two heat races, with the lineup for Heat 1 being determined by a random draw. The results of Heat 1 are inverted to determine the lineup for Heat 2. The average finish of both heats is used to determine the lineup for the feature race.

The heat races are 12 minutes each in length. At Five Flags, the feature length was 75 laps with the final 10 laps having to be run under green flag conditions.

Five Flags Speedway
Prior to the event, Hélio Castroneves was announced as a last minute entrant after not being originally scheduled to compete. Bubba Pollard was awarded pole for Heat 1 based on a random draw. Paul Tracy snatched the lead at the start until Pollard retook it with slightly over eight minutes remaining. With under a minute left, Castroneves spun Ernie Francis Jr. while making a pass attempt but the race stayed green. Pollard proceeded to hold off Tony Kanaan to win the heat. Francis was the polesitter for Heat 2 because of the inversion, however the damage he sustained in the previous heat caused him to drop backwards immediately and forced him into a backup car for the feature. Second place starter Castroneves would win after leading the entire heat. 

Due to their successful heat performances, Pollard and Kanaan would bring the field to green for the feature, with Pollard gaining the initial advantage and leading until being passed on lap 7 by Ryan Newman. Pollard retook the lead on lap 12, however it would be short lived as Kanaan surpassed him for first on lap 17. Under the first fun flag caution on lap 21, Pollard was forced to pit due to a flat left rear tire, relegating him to the rear of the field from third position. Kanaan would maintain the lead on the restart and held it after the second fun flag yellow on lap 38. When the feature restarted after the final fun flag with 15 laps remaining, Kanaan and Castroneves would remain side by side for multiple laps before Castroneves eventually prevailed. Castroneves finished first, with Pollard moving Newman for second position on the last lap. In a post race interview, it was revealed that SRX chief executive Don Hawk promised Castroneves a NASCAR ride at Daytona if he won an event.

Heat 1 Top 5 Results:

Heat 2 Top 5 Results:

Feature Top 5 Results:

Results and standings

Race results

Drivers' championship
(key) * – Most laps led (feature). 1 – Heat 1 winner. 2 – Heat 2 winner.

† - Driver was ineligible for points in this race

Points are awarded for both heat races as well as the feature:

See also
 2022 NASCAR Cup Series
 2022 NASCAR Xfinity Series
 2022 NASCAR Camping World Truck Series
 2022 IndyCar Series
 2022 Indy Lights
 2022 ARCA Menards Series
 2022 ARCA Menards Series East
 2022 ARCA Menards Series West
 2022 NASCAR Whelen Modified Tour
 2022 NASCAR Pinty's Series
 2022 NASCAR Mexico Series
 2022 NASCAR Whelen Euro Series

References

External links
 

Superstar Racing Experience
SRX Series
SRX Series
SRX Series